National Highway 63 (NH 63) is a National Highway in India, total length . It passes through the states of Maharashtra , Telangana, Maharashtra, Chhattisgarh & Odisha.

Route
The highway starts at Kuslamb Barshi and passes through:
 Maharashtra: Kuslamb, Yedshi, Latur, Renapur, Ashtamod, Nalegaon Udgir, Deglur, Sironcha, Kopela and Pathagudam
Telangana: Bodhan, Nizamabad, Armoor, Metpalli, Koratla, Jagtial, Lakshettipet, Dharmapuri, Mancherial and Chinnoor (Chennur)
 Chhattisgarh: Bhopalpatnam, Madded, Bijapur, Nimed, Bhairamgarh, Varetumnar, Gidam, Bagmundi and Jagdalpur
 Odisha: Kotpad and Borigumma

The highway crosses National Highway 52 at Yedshi.
The highway crosses National Highway 548B at Latur , Renapur.
The highway crosses National Highway 361 at Ashtamod.
The highway crosses National Highway 50 at Udgir.
The highway crosses National Highway 44 at Armoor.
National Highway 163 joins this highway at Bhopalpatnam.
National Highway 563 joins this highway at Jagtial.
National Highway 363 joins this highway at Mancherial.
National Highway 30 joins this highway at Jagdalpur.
National Highway 26 joins this highway at Borigumma which ends at Vizianagaram.
The highway crosses Godavari River on border of Peddapalli district and Mancherial district of Telangana state, Pranahita River on border of Maharashtra and Telangana and Indravati River on border of Maharashtra and Chhattisgarh. Bridges on border between Maharashtra and Telangana state across Pranahita River near Sironcha and across Indravathi River on Maharashtra and Chhattisgarh state near Bhopalpatnam are inaugurated and are functional. The future highway will connect Mumbai via Visakhapatnam, Cuttack and Bhubaneshwar.

Gallery

References

16
16
16
National highways in India